"Summer's Gone" is a 1984 song by The Kinks.

It may also refer to:
Summer's Gone, a 2012 album by Odesza
"Summer's Gone", a 1960 single by Paul Anka
"Summer's Gone", a song by the Beach Boys from the 2012 album That's Why God Made the Radio

See also
"Summer Gone", 1999 novel by David Macfarlane
 "Summer's Here", song by James Taylor, 1981
Summer Is Over (disambiguation)